Nalassus is a genus of darkling beetles belonging to the subfamily Tenebrioninae.

Selected species

References 

 Biolib
  Fauna Europaea

Tenebrioninae
Tenebrionidae genera
Beetles of Europe